Tito Vuolo (22 March 1893 – 14 September 1962) was an Italian-born American actor, best known for his supporting work playing often stereotypical Italian characters. Prior to his film career, he toured the United States as a stage actor. His wife was Grazia "Grace" Vuolo.

Vuolo was born in Gragnano, Campania, Italy, and died in Los Angeles, California.

Partial filmography

 1941 Shadow of the Thin Man as Luis, Waiter Pushing Sea Bass (uncredited)
 1947 Out of the Blue as Mario, Proprietor (uncredited)
 1947 The Web as Emilio Canepa
 1947 Kiss of Death as Luigi (uncredited)
 1947 Mourning Becomes Electra as Joe Silva
 1947 The Bishop's Wife as Maggenti
 1947 Daisy Kenyon as Dino (uncredited)
 1947 T-Men as Pasquale, Hotel Proprietor (uncredited)
 1948 B.F.'s Daughter as Mario, Speakeasy Waiter (uncredited)
 1948 Mr. Blandings Builds His Dream House as Mr. Zucca
 1948 I Wouldn't Be in Your Shoes as Campana, The Grocer
 1948 Sorry, Wrong Number as Albert, The Waiter (uncredited)
 1948 The Luck of the Irish as Italian Vendor (uncredited)
 1948 Cry of the City as Papa Roma (uncredited)
 1948 When My Baby Smiles at Me as Proprietor (uncredited)
 1949 Flamingo Road as Pete Ladas
 1949 The Fountainhead as Pasquale Orsini (uncredited)
 1949 House of Strangers as Lucca
 1949 The Great Gatsby as Mavromichaelis
 1949 The Red Danube as Italian Billposter (uncredited)
 1949 Everybody Does It as Makeup Man
 1950 The Petty Girl as Faustini, Head Waiter (uncredited)
 1950 Between Midnight and Dawn as Romano
 1950 Deported as Postal Clerk
 1950 Southside 1-1000 as Babo, Storekeeper (uncredited)
 1950 The Man Who Cheated Himself as Pietro Capa
 1951 The Mating Season as Industrialist At Venetian Hotel (uncredited)
 1951 The Enforcer as Tony Vetto
 1951 Up Front as Tarantino
 1951 The Great Caruso as Pietro Toscano (uncredited)
 1951 Saturday's Hero as Manuel
 1951 The Racket as Tony, Nick's Barber
 1951 The Raging Tide as Barney Schriona
 1952 Somebody Loves Me as Harry, The Barber (uncredited)
 1952 Stars and Stripes Forever as Tony Rector (uncredited)
 1953 My Friend Superman (TV Series) as Tony
 1954 Phantom of the Rue Morgue as Pignatelli, Tenant (uncredited)
 1955 Young at Heart as Italian Husband (uncredited)
 1955 Six Bridges to Cross as Angie
 1955 The Racers as Mechanic (uncredited)
 1955 It's Always Fair Weather as Silvio (uncredited)
 1955 The McConnell Story as Italian Grocer (uncredited)
 1955 Sincerely Yours as Italian Restaurant Proprietor (uncredited)
 1955 Hell on Frisco Bay as Tony (uncredited)
 1956 The Killing as Joe 'Piano'
 1956 Emergency Hospital as Ramon Corden (uncredited)
 1957 Dragstrip Girl as Papa
 1957 20 Million Miles to Earth as Commissario Unte
 1957 The Helen Morgan Story (1957) as Tony (uncredited)
 1958 Playhouse 90 as Albert Anselmi 
 1959 Some Like It Hot as Mozzarella (uncredited)
 1959 The Five Pennies as Barber (uncredited)

References

External links
 

1893 births
1962 deaths
American male film actors
20th-century American male actors
Italian emigrants to the United States